Anna M. G. Koltunow  is an Australian plant physiologist researching how plants reproduce. As of 2020 she is Professorial Research Fellow in the Centre for Crop Science at the University of Queensland. She is leading research for the second phase of a project funded by the Bill & Melinda Gates Foundation.

Koltunow graduated from Flinders University in 1981 with a BSc(Hons). She was awarded a PhD by the University of Adelaide in 1987.

From 2002 to 2006 Koltunow was president of the International Association of Sexual Plant Reproduction Research. She was elected Fellow of the Australian Academy of Science in May 2016 and of the Australian Academy of Technological Sciences and Engineering in 2018.

Early life and career 
Koltunow worked as a post-doctoral fellow at CSIRO before joining the University of California, LA, from 1989 to 1990, before returning to an Australian Research Council Research Fellowship in Adelaide. She was the theme leader of Plant Industry at CSIRO. Koltunow has also worked on a humanitarian project to help farmers produce self-reproducing crops, including cowpea and sorghum crops, enabling farmers to be self-sufficient and produce higher yielding crops.

She also was on the panel of Women of Waite supporting careers in STEM, discussing career paths, and different career disciplines, inspiring young scientists to take up careers in STEM. She also has been involved in wine making from the McLaren vale.

The Australian Academy of Science described her work as follows:"Her pioneering work in apomixis, developing and using an apomict species where remarkably, female gametes form without meiosis, and seeds develop in the absence of paternal fertilization as a genetic and molecular model has identified similarities and differences in the mechanisms controlling apomixis and sexual seed formation. Koltunow's discoveries are being used in developing crops with transformational productivity improvements in developing countries."Koltunow has worked in plant industry as well in plant seed and fruit development, and asexual seed formation.

Koltunow held senior leadership roles at CSIRO, including as the Deputy Chief. She was on the Premier's science council in South Australia, and held a role on the ARC College of Experts.

Selected publications

Awards 

 2018, Fellow of the Academy of Technology, Science and Engineering.
 2016, Fellow of the Academy of Science.
 2010, Outstanding service award from the International Plant Reproduction society.
 2008, Newton Turner Career Award.

References 

Living people
Year of birth missing (living people)
Plant physiologists
Australian women scientists
University of Adelaide alumni
Academic staff of the University of Adelaide
Academic staff of La Trobe University
Academic staff of the University of Queensland
Fellows of the Australian Academy of Science
Fellows of the Australian Academy of Technological Sciences and Engineering